Denton Eric Daley (born March 18, 1982) is a Canadian former professional boxer who competed from 2010 to 2017. He challenged for the WBA interim cruiserweight title in 2014 and at regional level held the WBC-NABF, Canadian, and Commonwealth cruiserweight titles between 2013 and 2016.

Early career
Daley, also known as the "Brampton Bomber" won 26 amateur fights before turning pro while running his own businesses.

Professional career
Daley won the North American Boxing Federation cruiserweight title by defeating Richard Hall.

Denton defeated Jean Marc Monrose to retain the WBA-NABA Cruiserweight Title.

Daley lost to Youri Kayembre Kalenga for the interim World Boxing Association cruiserweight title.

In 2016, Denton defeated Sylvera Louis winning the NCC cruiserweight and the vacant Commonwealth cruiserweight titles, Daley became the second Canadian to win the Commonwealth cruiserweight title with the first being Troy Ross when he won it in 2007.

Championships and accomplishments
National Championship of Canada
NCC Cruiserweight Championship (One time)
Commonwealth Boxing Council
Commonwealth Cruiserweight Championship (One time)
North American Boxing Federation
NABF Cruiserweight Championship (One time)
World Boxing Association/North American Boxing Association
WBA-NABA Cruiserweight Championship (One time)

Professional boxing record

References

External links

Living people
Cruiserweight boxers
Canadian male boxers
Commonwealth Boxing Council champions
1982 births